Lee Valley Tools Ltd. is a Canadian business specializing in tools and gifts for woodworking and gardening.

Corporate identity
The company is family-owned. The founder, Leonard Lee, was a recipient of the Order of Canada. He founded the company in 1978, in Ottawa, Ontario. Over the next ten years, the company opened several more stores in Toronto and Vancouver, and started manufacturing its own line of tools (starting with the Veritas Dovetail Marker in 1982). Since then, it has continued opening stores, manufacturing more diverse tools, and selling through mail order and the internet. In 1998, Canica Design was launched. Canica is a medical design company associated with Lee Valley Tools  which arose out of consultations between Leonard Lee and surgeon Michael Bell after Lee found that Bell was using Lee Valley tools in his plastic surgery practice.

Lee Valley Tools is notable for enforcing and codifying the concept of “pay slope” limiting the pay at the highest levels in the company based on what the lowest paid employees earn. They earned a slot in the Forbes Top 500 Employers list in 2018.

Consumer sales
The primary business is mail-order and retail, purveying mainly woodworking and gardening tools and equipment, as well as woodworking hardware and gifts. The consumer part of the business runs under the main company name, Lee Valley Tools.

Veritas Tools

Lee Valley also has a manufacturing arm, called Veritas Tools. Veritas makes many woodworking hand-tools, including hand planes, marking gauges and other measuring tools, router tables, sharpening systems, and numerous other gadgets. Veritas does research and development activities for the factory line, and has developed and patented many innovative designs.

References

External links 
 
 Veritas Tools

Hardware stores of Canada
Canadian brands
Tool manufacturing companies of Canada
Woodworking
Manufacturing companies based in Ottawa
Retail companies established in 1978
1978 establishments in Ontario